Terceiro Comando (Portuguese for Third Command) is a Brazilian criminal organization engaged in drug trafficking in Rio de Janeiro. It was founded in the early 1980s and is a break-away faction of the Comando Vermelho.

The Terceiro Comando has fought several small-scale conflicts (in 2001 and 2004) with the rival gang Comando Vermelho.

The organization has no sole leader and is instead a horizontal reciprocity based network that helps member-gangs in different favelas as they attempt to acquire drugs and guns.

References 

Organized crime groups in Brazil
1980s establishments in Brazil